Essias van Rooyen (born 27 March 1960) is a South African cricketer. He played in ten first-class and six List A matches for Boland from 1980/81 to 1988/89.

See also
 List of Boland representative cricketers

References

External links
 

1960 births
Living people
South African cricketers
Boland cricketers
Cricketers from Cape Town